This is a list of Members of Parliament (MPs) in the Rump Parliament which was the final stage of the Long Parliament which began in the reign of King Charles I and continued into the Commonwealth.

In December 1648 the army imposed its will on parliament and large numbers of MPs were excluded under Pride's Purge, creating the Rump Parliament. This left many constituencies without representatives. Many MPs who were not officially excluded did not participate in the affairs of the house. Although the parliament was dissolved in 1653 and four intervening parliaments were called, the Long Parliament was reconvened in 1659 for another dissolution.

This list contains details of the MPs in the house after 1648. For the original membership of the House of Commons in 1640 see List of MPs elected to the English parliament in 1640 (November). For the membership immediately preceding Pride's Purge, see List of MPs in the English parliament in 1645 and after

List of constituencies and MPs

See also
Rump Parliament
List of MPs nominated to the English parliament in 1653

Notes

References
The parliamentary or constitutional history of England;: being a faithful account of all the most remarkable transactions in Parliament, from the earliest times. Collected from the journals of both Houses, the records, ..., Volume 9
  cols. 1240–1250 — includes a description of events and list of imprisoned and secluded  members (cols. 1248–1249)

17th-century English parliaments
1648
 
1648 in England